The Caiuá Formation is an Early Cretaceous geologic formation in Brazil and Paraguay. Fossil theropod tracks have been reported from the formation. The formation, the lowermost unit of the Bauru Group, was deposited in the Barremian and Aptian epochs of the Early Cretaceous, around 130 to 120 Ma. The formation is unconformably overlain by the Santo Anastácio Formation and the unconformity probably represents the start of the opening of the South Atlantic and the formation of the Santos Basin.

See also 
 List of dinosaur-bearing rock formations
 List of stratigraphic units with theropod tracks
 List of fossiliferous stratigraphic units in Paraguay

References

Bibliography 
 
  

Geologic formations of Brazil
Geologic formations of Paraguay
Lower Cretaceous Series of South America
Cretaceous Brazil
Aptian Stage
Barremian Stage
Sandstone formations
Ichnofossiliferous formations
Fossiliferous stratigraphic units of South America
Paleontology in Brazil
Formations
Formations